Marsha Levick is a lawyer from Philadelphia, Pennsylvania, United States. She is a co-founder and Chief Legal Officer of the Juvenile Law Center and recognized as a leading expert in juvenile justice.

Career

Marsha Levick finished the Friends Select School, Pennsylvania and graduated from the University of Pennsylvania and Temple University Law School.

She and three other Temple University Law graduates founded the Juvenile Law Center in 1975.

She had led the Juvenile Law Center litigation before the Pennsylvania Supreme Court related Kids for cash scandal in Luzerne County, Pennsylvania.

She co-authored child advocates' amicus briefs for a number of cases before the Supreme Court:  Roper v. Simmons, Graham v. Florida, J. D. B. v. North Carolina, and Miller v. Alabama and served as a co-councel in Montgomery v. Louisiana.

She is an adjunct professor at the University of Pennsylvania Law School and Temple University Beasley School of Law.

Personal
Her father was an oncologist and her mother was a psychologist who founded the first graduate-level art therapy program in the country at Hahnemann University Hospital.

Levick is married to Tom Innis, a Philadelphia public defender and they have two daughters.

Notable cases
 Pennsylvania Kids for cash scandal: Levick represented juveniles in two of several class action suits.

Awards
2015: The Philadelphia Award; Quotation: "Mrs Levick's career-long commitment to advancing and safeguarding the rights of Philadelphia's youth has changed the face of juvenile justice not just in Philadelphia, but across the nation"
Awards from professional associations:
Temple University’s Women's Law Caucus Professional Achievement Award (2006)
Pennsylvania Bar Association Child Advocate of the Year Award (2008)
Foundation for the Improvement of Justice Award (2009)
 Pennsylvania Prison Society Award for Meritorious Service (2009)
Philadelphia Bar Association's Andrew Hamilton Award (2009)
American Association for Justice Leonard Weinglass Award (2010)
American Bar Association Livingston Hall Award (2010)
Rutgers-Camden Black Law Student Association Champion of Justice Award (2010)
Clifford Scott Green Bill of Rights Award, Federal Bar Association, Philadelphia Criminal Justice Section (2010) (co-recipient)
Philadelphia Bar Association, Criminal Justice Section Thurgood Marshall Award (2011) (Co-recipient)
Other awards:
Philadelphia Inquirer Citizen of the Year (2009) (co-recipient)
The Legal Intelligencer, Women of Distinction (2010)
Good Shepherd Mediation Program Shepherd of Peace Award (2010)
Friends Select School, Distinguished Alumnae Award (2011)
Arlen Specter Award, The Legal Intelligencer (2013)
American Academy of Child and Adolescent Psychiatry (AACAP)  Catcher in the Rye Award (2017)

References

Further reading
Kathi Milliken-Boyd, James Windell, Sentencing Youth to Life in Prison: Justice Denied, 2022, 
The book describes, in part, impact of Marsha Levick to put forth the U.S. Supreme court ruling against the juvenile life without parole sentences

Year of birth missing (living people)
Living people
Lawyers from Philadelphia
University of Pennsylvania alumni
Temple University alumni
University of Pennsylvania faculty
Temple University faculty